R U All That?: Nickelodeon's Search For The Funniest Kid In America (February 2003 – July 2003) was an All That contest shown on Nickelodeon on July 26, 2003.

Main plot
Whoever won the contest would join the other cast members of Nickelodeon's sketch comedy All That. When the contest began in 2003, Christina Kirkman, a regular girl from Massachusetts, entered the contest and became a R U All That finalist, along with 4 other finalists, including Kendre Berry, Ryan Coleman, Colton Gosselin, and Stephanie Matto. 

At the end of the contest, she was declared the winner (a.k.a. the Funniest Kid in America), and won the spot as an all new cast member for Season 9 of All That. Ryan Coleman was declared the runner up. He eventually replaced Jamie Lynn Spears after she left All That to star on Zoey 101.

See also
SNICK
SNICK On-Air Dare
TEENick
All That

External links
RU All That? site

2003 television specials
All That